Wabun Tribal Council is a non-profit Regional Chiefs' Council representing Ojibway and Cree First Nations in northern Ontario, Canada.  The Council provides advisory services and program delivery to its seven Status and non-Status member-Nations.

Background

"Wabun" (from the Anishinaabe language: waaban) means "sunrise." Wabun Tribal Council was incorporated in October, 1989, and started operations in Timmins, Ontario, in April, 1990. The Tribal Council was formed under the Indian and Northern Affairs Canada (INAC) devolution policy to coordinate and deliver services devolved from INAC to First Nation communities at the local level.

Mission

According to their own website, the Wabun Tribal Council state their mission as "... providing quality services to its First Nation membership through innovative, culturally appropriate programming."

Council

The Council is made up of a representing Chief from each of the seven member communities. The Chiefs provide political direction to the organization in its strategic planning, government relations and policy development.  To assist in these activities, the Council maintains a political and advocacy staff to support its efforts in helping their communities to prosper.  In turn, the Council is a member of Nishnawbe Aski Nation, a Tribal Political Organization representing majority of Treaty 5 and Treaty 9 First Nations in northern Ontario. The council's activities are published and shared with the community through the council's Wabun Sun newsletter.

Member First Nations

 Beaverhouse First Nation
 Brunswick House First Nation
 Chapleau Ojibway First Nation
 Flying Post First Nation
 Matachewan First Nation
 Mattagami First Nation
 Wahgoshig First Nation

Services
Management / Administration
Financial Services
Economic Development & Technical Services
First Nations Government
Education
Health Services
C.H. Nursing Program
Patient Transportation Program
Diabetes Strategy
Crisis Team Coordination
Long Term Care
Health Advocacy & Representation
Mamo-Nuskomitowin (Aboriginal Human Resources Development)

Official address

Wabun Tribal Council
313 Railway Street
Timmins, Ontario  P4N 2P4
website

References

External links
INAC profile

Nishnawbe Aski Nation